Tan Chooi Leong or better known as Wang Yuqing (born 9 September 1961) is a Singaporean actor.

Education 
Wang studied at Willow Avenue Secondary School.

Career 
Prior to his acting career, Wang served out his NS days in the Aerodrome fire service. He was offered a contract by the Singapore Broadcasting Corporation (SBC) after completing the 3rd drama training course in 1982. 

Wang first acted in SBC's Army series before starring in SBC's earliest idol drama, The Flying Fish, in 1983, which catapulted him to stardom. 

In 1988, Wang almost joined Hong Kong's TVB but decided against it, citing his poor grasp of Cantonese and reluctance to leave a stable environment.

Initially he had left the industry in 1995 to concentrate on his second job as an insurance agent but returned to MediaCorp in 2000 as a freelancer at the persuasion of some friends. More recently he became known for playing darker characters and antagonists such as in The Golden Path, Unriddle 2 and Joys of Life.

Personal life 
Wang is a full-time insurance agent with Manulife Singapore. Wang has two sons and a stepson, teen actor Xavier Ong.

Filmography

Television

2008
 Love Blossoms II 心花朵朵开II as Wang Zhong Hui (Anthony) 王仲辉
 Love Blossoms 心花朵朵开 as Wang Zhong Hui (Anthony) 王仲辉
 Taste of Love 缘之烩 as Gary
2007
Kinship 2 手足2
The Peak 最高点 as Cai Kang 蔡康
Making Miracles 奇迹
Metamorphosis 破茧而出
Man of the House 男人当家
Live Again 天堂鸟 as Zhou Jian Nan 周建南
The Golden Path 黄金路
2006
Love at 0°C 爱情零度C as She Jing Yuan 佘敬远
The Shining Star 星闪闪
Family Matters 法庭俏佳人
2005
Love Concerige 爱的掌门人 as Peter
Portrait of Home II 同心圆2
Beyond The aXis of Truth II 法医X档案2 之《复生人》 as Prof Roland 罗伦院长
2004
Double Happiness 喜临门
2002
Cash is King (SPH MediaWorks Channel U production) 胜券在握
2001
The Stratagem 世纪攻略

1996
Beyond Dawn 女子监狱 as Dr. Wei 卫医生

1995
Sparks of Life 生命火花 as Jiang Yu De 江裕德

1994 
The Magnate 叱咤风云 as Zhang Tian Wu 张天武
Dark Obsession 疯蝶 (Telemovie) as Michael 麦克

1993
Endless Love 未了缘 as Zhou Yi Hong 周亦宏
Sister Dearest 傻妹俏娇娃 as Lin Zhen Hua 林震华
The Wilful Siblings 斗气姐妹 as Zhou Da Wei 周大卫

1992
Duel La Shanghai 轰天龙虎 as Yan Wen Hao 严文浩
Lady Steel 激情女大亨 as Weng Jia Wei 翁家卫

1991
Fatal Endearment 谍海危情 as Li Guo Qiang 李国强
Home Sweet Home 宜家宜乐
The Other Woman 醋劲100 as Guo Ming Wei 郭明威

1990
By My Side 逆风天使 as Luo Yun Feng 骆云峰
Enchanted Eyes 天眼 as Tuo Shan & Chen Cang Long 脱善/陈苍龙

1989
Two Different Lives 金兰结 as Lin Zhen Bang 林振邦
The Sword Rules 剑断江湖 as Long Cheng Feng 龙乘风
A Mother's Love 亲心唤我心 as Lin Xiao Liang 林孝良

1988
Star Maiden 飞越银河 as Wen Jia Yu 文家宇
Airforce 空军 as Liu Shao Hui 刘绍辉
Mystery 1-Butterfly 迷离夜 之《蝶》as Shao Xue Liang 邵学良
Strange Encounters 2 奇缘2 之《胭脂魂》、《心锁》 as Meng Jian Fei & Shang Guan Long 孟剑飞、上官龙

1987
Five Foot Away 五脚基 as Xue Tian Xi 薛添喜
Fury of the Dragon 冷月剑无言 as Feng San 凤三
Strange Encounters 奇缘 之《银河星》 as Zhao Ying 赵颖

1986
The Happy Trio 青春123 as Zhou Wen Qin 周文钦
The Bond 天涯同命鸟 as Chuan Qi Wu Fu 川崎武夫

1985
The Tycoon 豪门内外 as Chen Ming Lun 陈铭伦
The Young Heroes 少年英雄 as Du Ming Xuan 杜明轩
The Coffee Shop 咖啡乌

1984
The Awakening as He Guo Rui 何国瑞
Growing Up 吾家有子

1983
The Army Series 新兵小传 as Chen Guo Qiang 陈国强
The Flying Fish as Wang Shu Qi 王书琪
Singapore Idol 1983

Accolades

References 

Singaporean male television actors
Living people
Singaporean people of Chinese descent
1961 births